The Passionate Demons is a 1961 Norwegian drama film directed by Nils Reinhardt Christensen. It was entered into the 1961 Cannes Film Festival.

Cast
 Margarete Robsahm - Line
 Toralv Maurstad - Jacob
 Henki Kolstad - Gabriel Sand
 Sissel Juul - Hanne
 Elisabeth Bang - Jacob's Sister
 Rønnaug Alten - Jacob's Mother
 Truuk Doyer - A Passionate Demon
 Rolf Søder - Benna
 Rolf Christensen - Jacob's Father
 Atle Merton - Laffen
 Per Lillo-Stenberg - Jeno
 Ragnhild Hjorthoy - Ellen
 Per Christensen - Putte
 Odd Borg - Kalle
 Ulf Wengård - Pål
 Frithjof Fearnley - Line's father
 Wenche Medbøe - Veslemøy
 Olava Øverland - A passenger

References

External links

1961 films
1960s Norwegian-language films
1961 drama films
Norwegian black-and-white films
Films directed by Nils Reinhardt Christensen
Norwegian drama films